The Bedford Road Invitational Tournament (BRIT) is one of the most prestigious, and largest boys high school basketball tournaments in all of Canada.  It takes place every January at Bedford Road Collegiate in Saskatoon, Saskatchewan. The current format has 12 schools take part in the tournament.  Some notable alumni of BRIT include Martin Riley, Brent Charleton, Karl Tilleman, John Hatch, Byron Tokarchuk, Eric Mobley, and Robert Sacre.

History
BRIT began in the fall of 1968 with only Saskatoon city school invited to the tournament.  The following year, schools from Regina and Weyburn were invited, making it a provincial-wide tournament. In 1972, schools from outside of Saskatchewan were invited for the first time. Winnipeg Sisler and Calgary E.P. Scarlett were invited and the magnitude of the tournament began to grow with the inviting of out-of-province teams.

In 1975, the tournament moved from December to its current January time frame. Teams from British Columbia, Ontario, and Quebec made their first appearances during the late 1970s.  In 1988, the first American team entered the tournament, the New York Gauchos, and they became the first foreign school to win the tournament. In 1998, the tournament format expanded to the current 12-team format. In 2004, the first non North American team entered the tournament as Scots College came from Sydney, Australia to take part. BRIT is one of the major sporting events on the Saskatoon sporting calendar. The tournament is attended by scouts of many colleges and universities as BRIT is one of the premier high school tournaments in all of Canada.

In 2020, the tournament was held for the 52nd time.  Vancouver Handsworth won the title for the fifth time in their school history.  Teams came from British Columbia, Alberta, Manitoba, and Quebec.

Champions

 1968 - Saskatoon Bedford Road
 1969 - Regina Sheldon-Williams
 1970 - Regina Sheldon-Williams
 1971 - Saskatoon Mount Royal
 1972 - Winnipeg Sisler
 1973 - Regina Sheldon-Williams
 1975 - Regina Sheldon-Williams
 1976 - Regina Sheldon-Williams
 1977 - Burnaby (B.C.) South
 1978 - Calgary Sir Winston Churchill
 1979 - Clearbrook (B.C.) Mennonite Educational Institute
 1980 - Clearbrook (B.C.) Mennonite Educational Institute
 1981 - Ottawa Bell
 1982 - Ottawa Bell
 1983 - Ottawa St. Pius X
 1984 - Calgary E.P. Scarlett
 1985 - Edmonton M.E. Lazerte
 1986 - Edmonton M.E. Lazerte
 1987 - Winnipeg Kelvin
 1988 - New York Gauchos
 1989 - Winnipeg Windsor Park
 1990 - Saskatoon Walter Murray
 1991 - Edmonton Harry Ainley
 1992 - Edmonton Harry Ainley
 1993 - Ottawa Nepean
 1994 - Pitt Meadows (B.C.)
 1995 - Calgary Bishop Caroll
 1996 - Edmonton M.E. Lazerte
 1997 - Saskatoon Holy Cross
 1998 - North Vancouver - Carson Graham
 1999 - Regina Balfour
 2000 - Edmonton Ross Sheppard
 2001 - Edmonton Ross Sheppard
 2002 - Calgary Lester B. Pearson
 2003 - Saskatoon Holy Cross
 2004 - Saskatoon Holy Cross
 2005 - North Vancouver - Handsworth
 2006 - North Vancouver - Handsworth
 2007 - North Vancouver - Handsworth
 2008 - Vancouver College
 2009 - Vancouver College
 2010 - Pitt Meadows (B.C.)
 2011 - Vancouver St. George's
 2012 - The Scots College (Australia)
 2013 - Calgary Sir Winston Churchill
 2014 - Regina LeBoldus
 2015 - Regina LeBoldus
 2016 - Edmonton Archbishop O'Leary
 2017 - Edmonton St. Francis Xavier
 2018 - North Vancouver - Handsworth
 2019 - Calgary Bishop McNally
 2020 - North Vancouver - Handsworth
 2021 - Cancelled due to COVID-19
 2022 - Cancelled due to COVID-19
 2023 - Raymond (Alberta)

External links

Sport in Saskatoon